Jang Hye-jin (born 15 May 1965) is a South Korean singer.

Discography

Album
1991: 1st album "In My Dreams Always" (꿈속에선 언제나)
1992: 2nd album "White"
1994: 3rd album "Before The Party"
1996: 4th album "Temptation"
1998: 5th album "Dream"
2001: 6th album & Best Album "It's My Life"
2006: 7th album "4 Season Story"

Single
2015: 오래된 사진
2015: Ordinary 0325
2015: Ordinary 0508
2015: Ordinary 0710
2015: Ordinary 0817

OST
2002: Glass Slippers OST – For Your Love
2005: My Rosy Life OST – Rosy Life
2006: One Fine Day OST – Tears Falling
2007: White Tower OST – Body Temperature
2008: Between Dog and Wolf OST – Hidden Sky
2009: Cain and Abel OST – Painful Breakup (Sad Theme)
2010: Bad Guy OST – Don't Laugh, Don't Cry (ft 4MEN)
2010: Jejoongwon OST – That's Life
2011: Royal Family OST – Tears
2011: Man of Honor l OST – It's Because of Love
2012: Faith OST – Bad Guy
2012: Rascal Sons OST – One
2020 When My Love Blooms OST - The Season Like You

Filmography

Television series
2011: I Am a Singer
2012: Top Band
2015: King of Masked Singer
2016: Fantastic Duo (Episode 5 & 6)
2016: Duet Song Festival (Episode 19)

References

External links
 Official website 
 
 Jang Hye-jin Fancafe at Daum 

Living people
South Korean women pop singers
1965 births
Jellyfish Entertainment artists